The Shire of Cuballing is a local government area in the Wheatbelt region of Western Australia.

Over 10% of its area contains native dryandra forests. The economy, worth approximately $20 million per year to the state economy, is based on agriculture, with cereal grains, sheep and pig farming  being the main activities.

History
On 31 October 1902, the Cuballing Road District was created. On 1 July 1961, it became a shire following the enactment of the Local Government Act 1960.

Wards
On 3 May 2003, the shire was divided into two wards.

 North Ward (three councillors)
 South Ward (four councillors)

Between 1912 and 2003, the ward names were as follows:
 Cuballing Ward
 North West Ward
 North East Ward
 Central West Ward
 Central East Ward
 South West Ward
 South East Ward

Towns and localities
The towns and localities of the Shire of Cuballing with population and size figures based on the most recent Australian census:

Population

Heritage-listed places

As of 2023, 28 places are heritage-listed in the Shire of Cuballing, of which three are on the State Register of Heritage Places.

References

External links
 

Cuballing